Carlos Miguel Maximiano de Almeida Coelho (born 20 May 1960 in Lisbon) is a Portuguese politician who served as a Member of the European Parliament from 1998 until 2019. He is a member of the Social Democratic Party–People's Party coalition; part of the European People's Party–European Democrats group.

Member of the European Parliament 
From 11 July 2000 to 6 September 2001, Coelho served as the chairman of the Temporary Committee on the ECHELON Interception System.

From 26 January 2006 to 14 February 2007, Coelho was chairman of the Temporary Committee on the alleged use of European countries by the CIA for the transport and illegal detention of prisoners. In addition to his committee assignments, he is a member of the European Parliament Intergroup on Children's Rights and of the European Parliament Intergroup on Disability, Member.

References

External links
 

1960 births
Living people
Social Democratic Party (Portugal) MEPs
MEPs for Portugal 1999–2004
MEPs for Portugal 2004–2009
MEPs for Portugal 2009–2014
MEPs for Portugal 2014–2019